Leandro dos Santos de Jesus or simply Makelele  (born February 26, 1985, in Salvador), is a Brazilian defensive midfielder, who currently plays for Botafogo.

Career 
On 25 September 2009, it was announced the 24-year-old midfielder from  Palmeiras will play on loan for Coritiba Foot Ball Club until the end of the Campeonato Brasileiro, in the next month of December 2009.

On 30 March 2016, it was confirmed that Makelele has signed with Botafogo.

Honours

Palmeiras
São Paulo State Championship: 2008

Notes

External links
 sambafoot
 CBF
 palmeiras.globo.com
 zerozero.pt
 globoesporte
 Makelele: «É um sonho jogar na Liga Europa»

1985 births
Living people
Brazilian footballers
Esporte Clube Santo André players
Sociedade Esportiva Palmeiras players
Grêmio Foot-Ball Porto Alegrense players
Coritiba Foot Ball Club players
S.C. Beira-Mar players
Associação Académica de Coimbra – O.A.F. players
Botafogo de Futebol e Regatas players
Sportspeople from Salvador, Bahia
Primeira Liga players
Brazilian expatriate footballers
Expatriate footballers in Portugal
Association football midfielders